Fustius sensora is a moth of the family Erebidae first described by Michael Fibiger in 2010. It is endemic to northern Thailand.

The wingspan is about 12 mm. The head, patagia, anterior part of tegulae, prothorax, basal part of the costa, triangular patch of the medial area and the terminal area, including the fringes are black. The forewing ground colour is beige suffused with light brown scales. The crosslines are untraceable, except for the weak antemedial line and terminal line marked by black interneural dots. The hindwing is beige, with a narrow brown terminal line. The fringes are white basally, otherwise beige. The underside of the forewing is grey brown, while the underside of the hindwing is grey.

References

Micronoctuini
Moths described in 2010
Taxa named by Michael Fibiger